Jan Sint (30 March 1887 – 8 February 1941) was a Dutch wrestler. He competed at the 1912, 1920 and the 1924 Summer Olympics.

References

External links
 

1887 births
1941 deaths
People from Leiderdorp
Olympic wrestlers of the Netherlands
Wrestlers at the 1912 Summer Olympics
Wrestlers at the 1920 Summer Olympics
Wrestlers at the 1924 Summer Olympics
Dutch male sport wrestlers
Sportspeople from South Holland